Leslie Schofield (born 12 December 1938) is an English actor who is most famous in the UK for his role as Jeff Healy in the soap opera EastEnders, whom he played from 1997 to 2000. His character was famous for unsuccessfully proposing to Pauline Fowler (played by Wendy Richard). He also appeared in EastEnders briefly in 1988 and 1989 playing a different character named Brian Wicks.

Schofield appeared as Chief Bast, an Imperial Officer aboard the doomed Death Star in George Lucas's first released Star Wars film, Star Wars Episode IV: A New Hope, in 1977. He also appeared in Star Wars Holiday Special, as the producers used deleted scenes and stock footage from A New Hope. His other film appearances included The Body Stealers (1969), Twinky (1969), Villain (1971), The Ruling Class (1972), The Glitterball (1977), The Wild Geese (1978), Force 10 from Navarone (1978), Silver Dream Racer (1980) and Dead Man's Folly (1986).

TV appearances in science fiction programmes include two Doctor Who stories, The War Games (1969), and The Face of Evil (1977) and as prison ship officer Raiker in the Blake's 7 episode "Spacefall" (1978).  He appeared in an episode of Midsomer Murders entitled "Vixen’s Run" and an episode of Minder, You Lose Some, You Win Some.  Schofield also played Reggie Perrin's son-in-law, Tom in the third series of The Fall and Rise of Reginald Perrin, Len in The Smoking Room, the father in the BBC children's drama Jonny Briggs and CBBC comedy show ChuckleVision.

Some of Leslie Schofield's earlier acting experiences took place when he served in the Fleet Air Arm of the Royal Navy. After performances at HMS Ariel (Later HMS Daedalus) he was moved to HMS Seahawk near Helston in Cornwall, where he participated in amateur productions. It was his performance as John Proctor in the Navy Drama Festival of 1963 which brought him to the attention of Walter Lucas, the adjudicator and then director of the British Drama League, who helped him to leave the Navy and start in repertory theatre.

Filmography

References

External links

1938 births
English male film actors
English male soap opera actors
Living people
Male actors from Oldham
20th-century English male actors
21st-century English male actors